The 2018–19 Virginia Cavaliers women's basketball team represented the University of Virginia during the 2018–19 NCAA Division I women's basketball season. The Cavaliers, led by first year head coach Tina Thompson, played their home games at John Paul Jones Arena and were members the Atlantic Coast Conference. They finished the season 12–19, 5–11 in ACC play to finish in twelfth place. They advanced to the second round of the ACC women's tournament where they lost to Syracuse.

Previous season
The 2017–18 Cavaliers finished the season 19–14, 10–6 in ACC play to finish in a 3-way tie for sixth place. They advanced to the quarterfinals of the ACC women's tournament where they lost to Notre Dame. They received an at-large bid to the NCAA women's tournament which was their first trip since 2009, where they defeated California first round before losing to South Carolina in the second round.

On March 20, Boyle announced her retirement, initially citing an unspecified family matter. She would later reveal that she retired because of snags in her ongoing attempt to finalize the adoption of her Senegalese daughter.  Boyle finished at Virginia with a record of 129–98.

On April 16, 2018 Tina Thompson was named as her replacement.

Recruiting Class

Source:

Roster

Schedule

Source:

|-
!colspan=9 style="background:#00214E; color:#F56D22;"|Non-conference regular season

|-
!colspan=9 style="background:#00214E; color:#F56D22;"|ACC regular season

|-
!colspan=9 style="background:#00214E; color:#F56D22;"| ACC Women's Tournament

Rankings

See also
 2018–19 Virginia Cavaliers men's basketball team

References

Virginia Cavaliers women's basketball seasons
Virginia